Sand Springs is a populated place situated in Apache County, Arizona, United States. It is one of two locations in Arizona with this name, the other being located in Coconino County.

References

Populated places in Apache County, Arizona